The  superyacht Baton Rouge was launched by ICON Yachts at their yard in Harlingen. The interior design of Baton Rouge was done by Tim Heywood and the exterior work was done by Redman Whiteley Dixon. She has two sister ships, the 2013 built Party Girl and the lengthened 2009 built Icon.

She is available as a charter yacht.

Design 
The hull is built out of steel while the superstructure is made out of aluminium with teak laid decks. The yacht is Lloyd's registered, issued by United Kingdom.

Engines 
She is powered by twin diesel MTU 12V4000M71 engines.

See also
 List of motor yachts by length
 ICON Yachts
 MY Party Girl
 MY Icon

References

2010 ships
Motor yachts
Ships built in the Netherlands